The 1997 season was the Oakland Raiders' 28th in the National Football League, their 38th overall, their 3rd since their return to Oakland, and their first under head coach Joe Bugel. They failed to improve upon their 7–9 from 1996 and finished with a 4–12 record, the worst finish for the Raiders since 1962; when they won only once in the final season before the arrival of Al Davis. The Raiders missed the playoffs for the fourth consecutive season.

Offseason

NFL draft 
  Darrell Russell DT
  Adam Treu C
  Tim Kohn G/T
  Chad Levitt RB
  Calvin Branch CB
  Grady Jackson DT

Staff

Roster

Regular season

Schedule

Game summaries

Week 12

Standings

Awards and records 
 Tim Brown, single game record, 14 receptions, achieved on December 21
 Napoleon Kaufman, single game record, 227 rushing yards, achieved on October 19
 Harvey Williams, single game record, 4 touchdowns (tied club record), achieved on November 16
 Napoleon Kaufman, single game record, 24 points, (tied club record), achieved on November 16
 Jeff George, single season record, most passing yards in one season, 3,917
 Tim Brown, single season record, most receptions in one season, 104
 Tim Brown, single season record, most receiving yards in one season, 1,408

Milestones 
 Tim Brown, 1st Raider to have 100 receptions in a season

References 

Raiders on Pro Football Reference

Oakland Raiders seasons
Oakland
Oakland